The Strada delle 52 Gallerie ("Road of 52 tunnels"), also known as the 52 Tunnel Road, or Strada della Prima Armata ("Road of the First Army") is a military mule road built during World War I on the Pasubio massif in Veneto, Italy.

The road winds between Bocchetta Campiglia  and the Porte del Pasubio  crossing the southern slope of the mountain with its spires, deep canyons and sheer rock faces, outside of the range of Austro-Hungarian artillery.

Features
The slope of the road reaches 22 percent, with an average of 12 percent.
Notable among the many tunnels is the 19th because, in addition to being the longest, it has a helical layout with 4 hairpin bends, inside a gigantic rock tower.
The Tunnel 20 is carved out of a rock tower, and to overcome the difference in height, twists around itself like a corkscrew. Tunnels 41 through 45 run below the Passo Fontana d'oro. On leaving the 47th, the highest point of the road, there is a magnificent panorama.

Completion
A masterpiece of military engineering and boldness (it was produced by the 33rd Miners Company of the Italian Army with the help of six hundred workers), considering the conditions and the time it was built, and the speed of execution. Work began on February 6, 1917, and was completed in November 1917.

Its implementation was of great strategic importance because it allowed communication and transfer of supplies from the base to the summit area of Mt. Pasubio. Key aspects of the road include year round access, located outside of enemy artillery range and accessible by mule. These were all problems with the similar road of Scarubbi which is only accessible with motorized vehicles, within the range of the Austro-Hungarian guns, and only during the summer.

Mountain biking is strictly prohibited due to a number of fatal accidents.

References

Notes

Cartography
  "Sentieri Pasubio e Carega-foglio Nord" 1:20.000 Sezioni vicentine del CAI
  Sentieri della val di Posina, edito dalla Provincia di Vicenza, assessorato al turismo 26 April 2013

Bibliography

External links
Strada 52 Gallerie 3D
 
  Strada delle 52 gallerie
  Strada delle 52 gallerie Itinerario
  Bericht über die Strada delle 52 Galerie im Explorermagazin

Hiking trails in Italy
Vicentine Alps
Italian front (World War I)